Bempton railway station serves the village of Bempton in the East Riding of Yorkshire, England. It is located on the Yorkshire Coast Line and is operated by Northern who provide all passenger train services.

The station formerly had two platforms and a signal box (which supervised the now automated level crossing here), but the second platform has been disused since the Bridlington to Hunmanby section was singled in 1969.  Goods sidings and weighbridge were located immediately north of the station.

Facilities
The station is unmanned, with a basic shelter on the single platform and a ticket machine located at the entrance to the platform.  The station house is now in private ownership.  Step-free access is available to the platform from the adjacent road.

Services

From May 2019, the service has been increased to hourly in both directions all week (from the former nine each way per weekday and six each way on Sundays that operated previously).

References

External links

Railway stations in the East Riding of Yorkshire
DfT Category F2 stations
Railway stations in Great Britain opened in 1847
Northern franchise railway stations
Stations on the Hull to Scarborough line
1847 establishments in England
Former York and North Midland Railway stations
George Townsend Andrews railway stations